Stampers Creek Township is one of ten townships in Orange County, Indiana, United States. As of the 2010 census, its population was 954 and it contained 386 housing units.

History
Stampers Creek Township took its name from Stampers Creek.

Lynd School was listed on the National Register of Historic Places in 2002.

Geography

Unincorporated towns
 Mahan Crossing at 
 Millersburg at 
 Trotter Crossing at 
(This list is based on USGS data and may include former settlements.)

Cemeteries
The township contains these two cemeteries: Copelin and Danners.

Major highways
  U.S. Route 150
  Indiana State Road 56

School districts
 Paoli Community School Corporation

Political districts
 Indiana's 9th congressional district
 State House District 62
 State Senate District 44

References
 
 United States Census Bureau 2008 TIGER/Line Shapefiles
 IndianaMap

External links
 Indiana Township Association
 United Township Association of Indiana
 City-Data.com page for Stampers Creek Township

Townships in Orange County, Indiana
Townships in Indiana